Libythea labdaca, the African snout butterfly, is a member of the butterfly subfamily Libytheinae found in western and central Africa.

Libythea laius was considered as a synonym earlier as it mostly similar to L. labdaca by sharing similar dorsal wing markings. But it differs from the latter in that the rectangular orange mark in discal cell apex is fused or separated from discal cell base.

It forms vast migratory swarms (over 1 billion butterflies were estimated in Ghana). The butterflies move south in the spring and north in the autumn.

The larvae feed on Celtis species (including C. kraussiana and C. sayauxii).

Subspecies
Libythea labdaca labdaca (Guinea, Sierra Leone, Liberia, Ivory Coast, Ghana, Togo, Benin, Nigeria, Cameroon, Bioko, São Tomé and Príncipe, Angola, Democratic Republic of the Congo, Uganda, western Kenya, western Tanzania)
Libythea labdaca laius Trimen, 1879 (Ethiopia, eastern Kenya, eastern and northern Tanzania, Malawi, Zambia, Angola, Mozambique, eastern Zimbabwe, northern Botswana, South Africa, Eswatini)

References

Sources
Kawahara, A. Y. 2006. Biology of the snout butterflies (Nymphalidae, Libytheinae), Part 1: Libythea Fabricius. Transactions of the Lepidopterological Society of Japan 57:13-33.
 , 2013: Systematic revision and review of the extant and fossil snout butterflies (Lepidoptera: Nymphalidae: Libytheinae). Zootaxa 3631 (1): 1-74. preview: .

External links
Libytheana page at Tree of Life

Butterflies described in 1851
Libythea